Cade Dylan Cowell (born October 14, 2003) is an American professional soccer player who plays as a winger for Major League Soccer club San Jose Earthquakes and the United States national team.

Club career
Cowell began his academy career at Ballistic United in Pleasanton, and in 2017–18, he led the nation in goals with 34 in 32 games for the under-15 club, before joining the San Jose Earthquakes academy in 2018.

On January 23, 2019, Cowell signed as a Homegrown Player with Major League Soccer side San Jose Earthquakes.

Cowell spent time on loan with San Jose's USL Championship affiliate club Reno 1868. He made his debut for Reno on June 8, 2019, and scored a 17th-minute goal during a 3–2 loss against San Antonio FC.

Cowell made his San Jose debut on June 11, 2019, as a 69th-minute substitute during a 4–3 win over Sacramento Republic in the 2019 U.S. Open Cup.

On March 7, 2020, Cowell logged his first minutes in an official MLS match when he subbed on at half-time in a 5–2 loss against Minnesota United FC. On August 29, 2020, Cowell made his first MLS start against the LA Galaxy playing 67 minutes, scoring his first goal for the club in a 3–2 loss.

International career
Cowell was named to the United States national under-17 team for the 2018 Four Nations Tournament and scored his first international goal against Chile.  The next spring, he was on the roster for the U-16 BNT roster for the UEFA development tournament in Prague, Czech Republic. He was invited to the U-23 Olympic qualifying camp in January 2021 and was on the preliminary roster for both the U-23 olympic squad and the Gold Cup roster in 2021.

In November 2021, Cowell was named to the United States national under-20 team for the 2021 Revelations Cup.

In December 2021, Cowell made his first senior appearance for the United States national team in a match against Bosnia and Herzegovina.

Personal life
Cowell is of Mexican-American descent through his maternal line and is eligible to play for both the United States and Mexico national teams. His mother, Amber Maldonado Cowell, earned multiple accolades in multiple sports in high school, as did his father, Debin Slade Cowell, who played football for San Jose State.  He is the eldest of three children. Cowell is a Christian.

Career statistics

Club

International

Honors 
United States U20
CONCACAF U-20 Championship: 2022

Individual
MLS All-Star: 2021

References

External links
 
 
 San Jose Earthquakes bio

2003 births
Living people
American soccer players
Homegrown Players (MLS)
San Jose Earthquakes players
Reno 1868 FC players
Association football forwards
Soccer players from California
People from Ceres, California
USL Championship players
United States men's youth international soccer players
Major League Soccer players
American sportspeople of Mexican descent
United States men's under-20 international soccer players
United States men's international soccer players